In India, a Municipal Council (also known as Municipality, Nagar Palika, or Nagar Palika Parishad) is an Urban Local Body that administers a city of population 100,000 or more. However, there are exceptions to that, as previously Nagar Palikas constituted in urban centers with populations over 20,000, so all the urban bodies which were previously classified as Nagar Palikas even if their population was under 100,000. Under the Panchayati Raj system. It interacts directly with the state government, though it is administratively part of the district it is located in. Generally, smaller district cities and bigger towns have a Nagar Palika.

Nagar Palikas are also a form of local self-government entrusted with some duties and responsibilities, as enshrined in the Constitutional (74th Amendment) Act, 1993. Under Article 243Q, it became obligatory for every state to constitute such units.

The 74th amendment made the provisions relating to urban local governments (Nagarpalikas).

Three tier structure:
 Municipal Corporation/City Corporation
 Municipality/Municipal Council
 Town Board

Four tier structure:
 Municipal Corporation/City Corporation
 City Municipal Council
 Town Municipal Council
 Town Board

Composition
The members of the Nagar Palika are  elected representatives for a term of five years. The town is divided into wards according to population, and representatives are elected from each ward separately. The members elect a president among themselves to preside over and conduct meetings. Employees of the state government of India, including Chief Officer, Town Planning Engineer, Auditor, Sanitary Inspector, Medical Officer for Health, and Education Officer, among many others, who come from the state public services, are appointed to handle the administrative affairs of the Nagar Palika.

Functions
The Nagar Palika is responsible for

 Water supply
 Hospitals
 Roads
 Street lighting
 Drainage
 Fire brigade
 Market places 
 Records of births and deaths 
 Solid waste management
 Maintaining gardens, parks and playgrounds
 Providing education to unprivileged children

Sources of income
A steady and adequate supply of funds is essential for the smooth running of all these programmes. The various sources of income of municipal bodies are:
 The income from taxes, including on houses, entertainment, electricity, water tax (in certain cities), vehicles, property, and land
 Toll tax is the most important income of a municipality. All commercial vehicles may receive toll taxes, except auto rickshaw.
Income is also generated from commercial activities like hotels, tourist centers, renting and sale of municipal property, and education cess.
 Financial grants from the state government are a major source of income for all municipal bodies. Loans are also provided if special projects are undertaken for citizens' welfare.
 Professional tax collection from all the employers, i.e. government and private sectors

See also
 Municipal governance in India

Sources

 Our Civic Life (Civics and Administration) - Maharashtra State Bureau of Textbook Production and Curriculum Research, Pune

Local government in India
Hindi words and phrases